Uhrichsville( ) is a city in Tuscarawas County, Ohio, United States. The population was 5,413 at the 2010 census. Claymont City School District is the major education provider for the city of Uhrichsville and for the village of Dennison, Ohio. The Twin cities is a nickname used to describe Uhrichsville and Dennison because they are adjacent and similar.

Geography
Uhrichsville is located at  (40.395208, -81.349226).

The area surrounding Uhrichsville is moderately flat.

History
Although the town was laid out under the name of "Waterford" in 1833, it was informally known as "Uhrich's Mill" after Michael Uhrich, a local mill operator, and in 1839 the town was officially renamed Uhrichsville.  It benefitted from the Ohio and Erie Canal and later from the Pan Handle Railroad.  Railroad shops built at nearby Dennison later added further to Uhrichsville's growth.

Uhrichsville Water Park opened in June 2008.  It has heated pools and features slides, waterfalls, buckets, and a water jungle-gym.

Demographics

2010 census
As of the census of 2010, there were 5,413 people, 2,176 households, and 1,379 families living in the city. The racial makeup of the city was 96.3% White, 1.4% African American, 0.1% Native American, 0.3% Asian, 0.3% from other races, and 1.6% from two or more races. Hispanic or Latino of any race were 0.8% of the population.

There were 2,176 households, of which 34.3% had children under the age of 18 living with them, 40.9% were married couples living together, 17.7% had a female householder with no husband present, 4.8% had a male householder with no wife present, and 36.6% were non-families. 30.6% of all households were made up of individuals, and 14.6% had someone living alone who was 65 years of age or older. The average household size was 2.44 and the average family size was 3.04.

The median age in the city was 36.5 years. 26.7% of residents were under the age of 18; 9.2% were between the ages of 18 and 24; 24.3% were from 25 to 44; 24.5% were from 45 to 64; and 15.3% were 65 years of age or older. The gender makeup of the city was 47.3% male and 52.7% female.

2000 census
As of the census of 2000, there were 5,662 people, 2,254 households, and 1,498 families living in the city.  The population density was 1,980.9 people per square mile (764.4/km). There were 2,523 housing units at an average density of 882.7 per square mile (340.6/km). The racial makeup of the city was 97.58% White, 1.11% African American, 0.19% Native American, 0.12% Asian, 0.09% from other races, and 0.90% from two or more races. Hispanic or Latino of any race were 0.62% of the population.

There were 2,254 households, out of which 34.2% had children under the age of 18 living with them, 47.8% were married couples living together, 14.4% had a female householder with no husband present, and 33.5% were non-families. 29.7% of all households were made up of individuals, and 15.8% had someone living alone who was 65 years of age or older. The average household size was 2.51 and the average family size was 3.08.

In the city the population was spread out, with 28.4% under the age of 18, 8.3% from 18 to 24, 28.8% from 25 to 44, 19.1% from 45 to 64, and 15.5% who were 65 years of age or older. The median age was 35 years. For every 100 females, there were 91.2 males. For every 100 females age 18 and over, there were 84.9 males.

The median income for a household in the city was $28,617, and the median income for a family was $32,217. Males had a median income of $28,138 versus $17,132 for females. The per capita income for the city was $13,144. About 12.0% of families and 14.6% of the population were below the poverty line, including 17.9% of those under age 18 and 11.0% of those age 65 or over.

Notable people
Cody Garbrandt, Former UFC Bantamweight Champion
Florence Wolf Gotthold, painter.
Brett Hillyer, attorney and State Representative 
Harry McClintock ("Haywire Mac"), singer.
Dean Sensanbaugher, American football player
Ella May Dunning Smith, composer and activist
Edwin Wolf, manufacturer and banker
Simon Wolf, attorney and activist

References

External links
 City website

Cities in Tuscarawas County, Ohio
Populated places established in 1833
1833 establishments in Ohio
Cities in Ohio